The Threegos is an album by The Bloody Hawaiians. It was released in 1994.

Track listing
 "Times For"
 "Heavenly Love"
 "Livin' in Bridgeville"
 "When Love Is Unlikely"
 "Clown Boy Division"
 "Bastards"
 "Dragonfly Fence"
 "After Kisses"
 "War In The Hills"
 "No Time To Lose"
 "Heir Baby"
 "Heart Song"
 "Love Factory"
 "Bandsaw"
 "Lemon"

External links 
The band's website
The albums website

1994 albums
The Bloody Hawaiians albums